Heat emission may refer to:

 Climate change
 Heat transfer
 Thermal radiation
 Thermal pollution